The Duke of Edinburgh-class cruiser was a class of two armoured cruisers built for the Royal Navy in the first decade of the 20th century. They were the first British armoured cruisers designed to work with the battlefleet rather than protect merchant shipping. After commissioning, they were assigned to the Atlantic, Channel and Home Fleets until 1913 when they were transferred to the Mediterranean Fleet. After the start of World War I in August 1914, the sister ships participated in the pursuit of the German battlecruiser  and light cruiser . After the German ships reached their refuge in Ottoman Turkey, the ships were ordered to the Red Sea for convoy escort duties. They captured three German merchant ships before they returned to home at the end of the year.

The sisters participated in the Battle of Jutland in May 1916 where  was sunk with all hands.  spent the next year on blockade duties in the North Sea before she was transferred to the Atlantic Ocean on convoy escort duties for the rest of the war. She was sold for scrap in 1920.

Design and description
After the preceding , the Royal Navy rethought how it planned to use its armoured cruisers. It decided that they were going to form a fast wing of the battlefleet, which meant that they required heavier armour and armament to fight their counterparts in opposing fleets (thus necessitating larger hulls and higher costs). Two armoured cruisers were planned for the 1902–1903 Naval Programme and the newly appointed Director of Naval Construction, Philip Watts designed what naval historian Oscar Parkes called: "cruiser editions of the s". In these, his first design, he perpetuated the worst feature of the designs by his predecessor, Sir William White, by placing the secondary armament of  guns in embrasures a deck below the main armament which meant that the guns were inoperable in anything more than a dead calm sea. A solution for this problem was offered after construction began when Watts learned that the ships would be lighter than expected and that weight would be available to replace the six-inch guns with  guns raised to the same deck as the main armament. The change would cost a total of £398,000 for the two ships, far too expensive for the Board of Admiralty, so it was rejected on 30 March 1904.

The Duke of Edinburgh-class ships were designed to displace , but they proved to be significantly lighter as built, displacing  at normal load and  fully loaded. The class was over  longer overall than the Devonshires and displaced over  more.

The ships' complement was 769 officers and enlisted men.

The engines were powered by 20 Babcock & Wilcox water-tube boilers and six cylindrical boilers.

Armament
The Duke of Edinburghs main armament consisted of six 45-calibre BL 9.2-inch Mk X guns in single-gun turrets, a much more powerful gun than used in the Devonshires. The guns were distributed in two centreline turrets, one each fore and one aft of the superstructure, and four wing turrets disposed in the corners about the funnels. The centreline turrets could traverse a total of 285° while the wing turrets were limited to about 120° on the broadside due to muzzle blast. The gun had an elevation range of −5° to +15°. The gun's rate of fire was about three rounds per minute and the ships carried 100 rounds for each gun.

Their secondary armament of ten 50-calibre BL 6-inch Mk XI guns was arranged in single embrasures. They were mounted amidships on the main deck and were only usable in calm weather. The guns could only traverse about 120° on the broadside. They initially had a maximum elevation of +13°, but this was later increased to +20°. Each gun was provided with 150 rounds.

Twenty Vickers quick-firing (QF) 3-pounder guns were fitted for defence against torpedo boats, six on turret roofs and fourteen in the superstructure, all on pivot mounts. These guns were too small to be useful against the torpedo boats before they got within torpedo range.

The ships also mounted three submerged 18-inch torpedo tubes. They carried a total of eighteen torpedoes in addition to the six  torpedoes that could be used by the two  steam pinnaces.

Armour
The Duke of Edinburgh-class ships had a  waterline armour belt of Krupp cemented armour that covered  of the hull amidships. Transverse bulkheads six inches thick protected the citadel from raking fire.

The faces of the gun turrets were 7.5 inches thick with  sides and a  roof. The barbettes were protected by six inches of armour as were the ammunition hoists, although the armour for those thinned to three inches between the armour belt. Two-inch armour screens separated each of the six-inch guns.

Modifications
The funnels proved to be too short in service and they were raised about  four years after completion to keep the superstructure free of smoke in a following wind. In March 1916, both ships had all their six-inch guns removed, the embrasures plated over, and six of the guns were remounted on the upper deck. In May 1917, two more were added to Duke of Edinburgh on the forecastle. The ship's foremast was converted to a tripod mast to support the weight of the fire-control director probably added in 1917.

Ships

Service history

Duke of Edinburgh and Black Prince served in the Channel, Atlantic and Home Fleets before World War I. They were stationed in the Mediterranean when World War I began and participated in the pursuit of the Goeben and Breslau as part of the 1st Cruiser Squadron, but was ordered not to engage. After the German ships reached Ottoman waters, the ships were sent to the Red Sea in mid-August to protect troop convoys arriving from India. While on escort duty they captured three German merchantmen.

The two sisters rejoined the 1st Cruiser Squadron in December 1914, which had transferred to the Grand Fleet and participated in the Battle of Jutland in May 1916. Black Prince became separated from the fleet when darkness fell and was sunk with all hands by German battleships later that night. Duke of Edinburgh was not damaged during the battle and was the only ship of her squadron to survive. After Jutland Duke of Edinburgh was ordered to reinforce the patrols north of the Shetland Islands against German blockade runners and commerce raiders. She was eventually transferred to the Atlantic in August 1917 for convoy escort duties. The ship was sold for scrap in 1920.

Notes

Footnotes

Bibliography

External links

The Dreadnought Project Technical details of the Duke of Edinburgh class.

Cruiser classes
 
Ship classes of the Royal Navy